TAI Şimşek is a turbojet-powered radio-controlled high-speed target drone designed, developed and built by Turkish Aerospace Industries (TAI) between 2009-2012 for the needs of the Turkish Armed Forces.

Şimşek is the Turkish word for "lightning".

Overview
The development of TAI Şimşek started in 2009, and its prototype was presented to public at the International Defence Industry Fair (IDEF '09) the same year. The UAV made its maiden flight on August 4, 2012.

TAI Şimşek simulates enemy aircraft and missiles for air-to-air, surface-to-air, anti-aircraft gunnery and missile systems’ tracking and firing trainings. It looks like tactical air-launched decoys (TALD), which are used to confuse and saturate enemy air defense.

TAI intends to further develop the drone to convert into a cruise missile with "Human-in-the-Loop" (HITL) guidance capability for use against mobile or fixed soft targets.

Payloads of TAI Şimşek consists of following features:
 Passive Radar Cross-Section Augmenter - Luneburg lens
 Passive IR Signature
 Miss Distance Indicator (MDI)
 Counter-measures Dispensing System
 Tracking Smoke Generator

The drone is launched from a catapult and recovered by parachute. It can take off and can be controlled from navy vessels.

In July 2020 TAI launched Şimşek from TAI Anka integrated arm and made history by launching the target drone from UAV for the first time.

Specifications

References

External links
Launch image of TAI Şimşek

Target drones of Turkey
Simsek
High-wing aircraft
Single-engined jet aircraft